was a Japanese politician from Yamaguchi Prefecture. He was a leading member of the ruling Liberal Democratic Party (LDP). He served as foreign minister from 1982 to 1986. He was the father of former Prime Minister Shinzo Abe.

Early life and education
Abe was born on April 29, 1924, in Tokyo, the eldest son of politician and member of Parliament Kan Abe. He was raised in his father's home prefecture of Yamaguchi from soon after his birth. His mother was an army general's daughter.

Abe married , daughter of Prime Minister Nobusuke Kishi, in 1951. His second son, Shinzo Abe, served as prime minister from 2006 to 2007 and from 2012 to 2020. His third son, Nobuo Kishi, was adopted by his brother-in-law shortly after birth, won a House of Representatives seat in 2012 and was appointed Minister of Defense in 2020.

Career
After graduating from high school in 1944 during World War II, Abe entered a naval aviation school and volunteered to become a kamikaze pilot.  The war ended before he could undergo the required training. In 1949 he graduated from the Faculty of Law at the University of Tokyo, Shintaro Abe began his career as a political reporter for Mainichi Shimbun. He became a politician in 1957, when he started working as a legislative aide of his father in-law, the then-prime minister Nobusuke Kishi. He won his father's seat in the House of Representatives in 1958.

He led a major LDP faction, the conservative Seiwa Seisaku Kenkyūkai, whose reins he took from former Prime Minister Takeo Fukuda in July 1986, and held a variety of ministerial and party posts, the former of which included Minister of Agriculture and Forestry and Minister of International Trade and Industry. Abe was named as Minister of International Trade and Industry in the cabinet of the then prime minister Zenkō Suzuki on November 30, 1981. During this period, he was seen as a young leader groomed for the future prime ministry. In November 1982, he was appointed Minister for Foreign Affairs in the cabinet of the then-prime minister Yasuhiro Nakasone, replacing Yoshio Sakurauchi. His term lasted until 1986.

Abe was a top contender to succeed Nakasone as prime minister in 1987, until he stepped aside for Noboru Takeshita, head of a powerful rival faction. Then, he was given the post of secretary general of the party in 1987. In 1988, his chances of becoming prime minister some time in the near future were again thwarted when his name became associated with the Recruit-Cosmos insider-trading stock scandal, which brought down Takeshita and forced Abe to resign as the party's secretary general in December 1988.

Death
Shintaro Abe was hospitalized in January 1991. He died at Tokyo's Juntendo University Hospital on May 15, 1991, aged 67. The cause of death was not officially announced, although various reports point to cancer, liver failure, or heart failure.

Honours
From the corresponding article in the Japanese Wikipedia

Grand Cordon of the Order of the Rising Sun with Order of the Paulownia Flowers

References

 

|-

|-
 
 

|-

|-

|-

|-

1924 births
1991 deaths
Foreign ministers of Japan
Government ministers of Japan
Members of the House of Representatives from Yamaguchi Prefecture
University of Tokyo alumni
Liberal Democratic Party (Japan) politicians
Recipients of the Order of the Rising Sun with Paulownia Flowers
Shinzo Abe
Kamikaze pilots
Parents of prime ministers of Japan